Pantopsalis coronata is a species from the genus Pantopsalis.

References

Sources

 
 
 
 
 
 
 

Harvestmen